The following is a list of the monastic houses in Nottinghamshire, England.

See also
 List of monastic houses in England

Notes

References

Medieval sites in England
Houses in Nottinghamshire
Nottinghamshire
Nottinghamshire
.
Lists of buildings and structures in Nottinghamshire